Robert Willson may refer to:
Robert Willson (artist) (1912–2000), American artist and sculptor notable for his creative use of solid glass
Robert Willson (bishop) (1794–1866), English Roman Catholic Bishop of Hobart in Australia
Bob Willson (born 1928), TV host
Robert Meredith Willson (1902–1984), American musician

See also
Robert Wilson (disambiguation)